Cisco Meraki is a cloud-managed IT company headquartered in San Francisco, California. Their products include wireless, switching, security, enterprise mobility management (EMM) and security cameras, all centrally managed from the web. Meraki was acquired by Cisco Systems in December 2012.

History
Meraki was founded by Sanjit Biswas and John Bicket, along with Hans Robertson. The company was based in part on the MIT Roofnet project, an experimental 802.11b/g mesh network developed by the Computer Science and Artificial Intelligence Laboratory at the Massachusetts Institute of Technology.

Meraki was funded by Google and Sequoia Capital. The organization started in Mountain View, California, in 2006, before relocating to San Francisco. Meraki employed people who worked on the MIT Roofnet project.

In 2007, Meraki selected San Francisco for their community-based Free the Net campaign. They started putting gateway devices in the Lower Haight neighborhood to provide Internet access and giving away repeaters. In the first year of the project, the growth of the network was primarily in the Mission District. By October 2007, they estimated 20,000 distinct users connected and about 5 terabytes of data transferred in this network. In July 2008, Meraki said 100,000 people in San Francisco used its "Free the Net" service. Since then, Meraki discontinued this public service, though many access points remain active, but with no connection to the Internet.

On November 18, 2012, Cisco Systems announced it would acquire Meraki for an estimated $1.2 billion.

Products

Access Points (MR)

Switches (MS)

Security Appliances (MX)

Customer data loss incident 
On August 3, 2017, the engineering team made changes to the North American object storage service; the change caused some deletion of customer data. Cisco stated that the change was due to the application of "an erroneous policy". The data loss mostly affected media files uploaded by customers. Lost data included:

 Systems Manager – Custom enterprise apps and contact images.
 Meraki Communications – IVR audio files, hold music, contact images and VM greetings.
 Wireless Device Dashboard – Custom floor plans, device placement photos, custom logos used for interface branding and reports and custom splash themes.

On August 7 Meraki announced that some data on the cache service could be recovered. On August 9 customers were informed that recovery efforts were still underway but that they "do not expect to be able to recover most assets".

See also
Cisco Systems
List of networking hardware vendors

References

External links

Wireless network organizations
Linux-based devices
Cisco Systems acquisitions
2012 mergers and acquisitions